St. Peter's Church is a Roman Catholic parish church  in the inner city of Munich, southern Germany. Its  tower is commonly known as "Alter Peter"Old Peterand is emblematic of Munich. St Peter's is the oldest recorded parish church in Munich and presumably the originating point for the whole city.

History
Before the founding of Munich as a city in 1158, there had been a pre-Merovingian church on this site. Eighth-century monks lived around this church on a hill called Petersbergl. At the end of the 12th century, a new church in the Bavarian Romanesque style was consecrated, and expanded in Gothic style shortly before the great fire in 1327, which destroyed the building. 

After its reconstruction the church was dedicated anew in 1368. In the early 17th century the  spire received its Renaissance steeple top and a new Baroque choir was added.

The church was heavily damaged in World War II during the Allied bombing of Munich.

The interior is dominated by the high altar to which Erasmus Grasser contributed the figure of Saint Peter. Among other masterpieces of all periods are five Gothic paintings by Jan Polack and several altars by Ignaz Günther. The ceiling fresco by Johann Baptist Zimmermann (1753–56) was restored in 1999–2000.

External links
 
 360° View from the Tower of St Peter's Church
 St Peter's Church - photos & infos (German)
 Der Alte Peter 

Baroque architecture in Munich
Gothic architecture in Munich
Tourist attractions in Munich
Roman Catholic churches in Munich
Cultural heritage monuments in Munich